"Even the Nights Are Better" is the song from 1982 by the British/Australian soft rock duo Air Supply, from their 1982 album Now and Forever.

Background
The lyrics of this song are sung from the perspective of a man who had a significant other get away at the song's beginning before the rest of the song's lyrics tell a much happier story from the lyricist's perspective of life with someone new who had the same feelings of loneliness as the lyricist.

Billboard said that "The deliberate solo vocal, delicate piano and string section interplay and chorus/bridge harmonies are direct links to [Air Supply's] past hits."

Music video
The video for "Even the Nights Are Better" was filmed in and around the boardwalk, beach, and amusement area of Coney Island, Brooklyn, New York.

Personnel
Russell Hitchcock - vocals
Graham Russell - vocals, guitar

Chart history
Released as a single in mid-1982, "Even the Nights Are Better" first charted in the United States on the Billboard Adult Contemporary chart, where it spent four weeks at No. 1 in July and August. This was Air Supply's third song to reach the summit on this chart. It also reached No. 1 on the Canadian AC chart. In September 1982, the song reached its peak position of No. 5 on the Billboard Hot 100, becoming the group's seventh consecutive top five hit on the US pop chart. In the United Kingdom, where the group did not enjoy the same amount of success as they did in Australia and the US, the song reached No. 44 on the UK Singles Chart.

Weekly charts

Year-end charts

Cover versions
The song has been covered by Canadian singer Anne Murray on her 1991 album Yes I Do, by Filipino singers Kyla and Piolo Pascual for the TV series Since I Found You in 2018 and by Suy Galvez and Brenan Espartinez in 2015. It was also covered by Paul Mauriat and Normie Rowe.

See also 
 List of number-one adult contemporary singles of 1982 (U.S.)

References

1982 singles
Air Supply songs
1982 songs
Arista Records singles
Song recordings produced by Harry Maslin
Anne Murray songs
Songs written by J. L. Wallace
Songs written by Terry Skinner
1980s ballads
Songs about nights